Fujine Station is the name of multiple train stations in Japan.

 Fujine Station (Iwate) - (藤根駅) in Iwate Prefecture
 Fujine Station (Shizuoka) - (富士根駅) in Shizuoka Prefecture